Simazine is an herbicide of the triazine class. The compound is used to control broad-leaved weeds and annual grasses.

Preparation
Simazine may be prepared from cyanuric chloride and a concentrated solution of ethyl amine (at least 50 percent by number) in water. The reaction is highly exothermic and is therefore best carried out in an ice bath below 10 °C.  It is also essential to carry out the synthesis in a fume hood since cyanuric chloride decomposes at high temperatures into hydrogen chloride and hydrogen cyanide, both of which are highly toxic by inhalation.

Properties and uses
Simazine is an off-white crystalline compound which is sparingly soluble in water.  It is a member of the triazine-derivative herbicides, and was widely used as a residual non-selective herbicide, but is now banned in European Union states.  Like atrazine, a related triazine herbicide, it acts by inhibiting photosynthesis.  It remains active in the soil for 2-7 months or longer after application.

See also 
 Atrazine

References

External links
 Simazine, Extoxnet PIP 

Herbicides
Triazines
Chloroarenes